The Haputo Beach Site is a prehistoric village site in northwestern Guam.  The site, located on Naval Computer and Telecommunications Station Guam land near a sheltered cove, includes standing latte stones, as well as rock shelters and caves with evidence of human occupation.  In addition to needing military permission for access to the site, the main trail leads through the Navy's Haputo Ecological Preserve.

The site was listed on the National Register of Historic Places in 1974.

See also
National Register of Historic Places listings in Guam

References

Archaeological sites on the National Register of Historic Places in Guam
Dededo, Guam
Beaches of Guam